Chirkata is a rural locality (a selo) in Gumbetovsky District, Republic of Dagestan, Russia. The population was 1,923 as of 2010. There are 15 streets.

Geography
Chirkata is located 29 km east of Mekhelta (the district's administrative centre) by road. Ashilta and Kakhabroso are the nearest rural localities.

References 

Rural localities in Gumbetovsky District